This is a list of Philippine Basketball Association imports by the highest total number of three-point field goals made in their stint or tenure with the league.

Statistics accurate as of January 16, 2023.

See also
List of Philippine Basketball Association players

References

Philippine Basketball Association
Lists of Philippine Basketball Association players